Roxy & Elsewhere  is a double live album by Frank Zappa and The Mothers, released on September 10, 1974. Most of the songs were recorded on December 8, 9 and 10, 1973 at The Roxy Theatre in Hollywood, California.

Overview
The material taken from the Roxy concerts was later amended with some overdubs in the studio, while the "Elsewhere" tracks ("Son of Orange County" and "More Trouble Every Day") were recorded on May 8, 1974, at the Edinboro State College, Edinboro, Pennsylvania (and parts of "Son of Orange County" on May 11, 1974, at the Auditorium Theatre in Chicago, Illinois (late show) and do not contain overdubbed material.

History

Album
The album primarily comprised recordings from three shows at the Roxy Theater in Hollywood, and featured tracks never before or thereafter released on any Zappa/Mothers album.

The opening track, "Penguin in Bondage" is edited together from performances at the Roxy and the Chicago date. The guitar solo on "Son of Orange County" is one of the few Zappa guitar solos edited together from more than one concert, in this case the Edinboro and Chicago dates.

Some of the unused tracks from the Roxy shows circulate as bootlegs, as well as the entirety of the Edinboro show. Other tracks were released on Volumes One, Three and Four of the You Can't Do That on Stage Anymore series. On a side note, Zappa can be heard, on the released and unreleased Roxy tapes, speaking of the making of a 'film' that could potentially be "broadcast on television", as well as reminding the audience not to be "uncomfortable around the intimidatingly large 16 mm cameras."

A four-channel quadraphonic version of the album was prepared and advertised, but not released.

The 2014 CD Roxy by Proxy includes other material from the Roxy shows, including alternate versions of some songs from Roxy & Elsewhere, with no overdubs.

In the documentary Genesis: Together and Apart, Phil Collins states that the twin drum solos in "Don't You Ever Wash That Thing?" is what inspired him to ask Chester Thompson to join the touring version of Genesis. Collins and Thompson also used the drum fill from the chorus of "More Trouble Every Day" in the coda of live versions of the Genesis song "Afterglow."

On February 2, 2018, Zappa Records/UMe released The Roxy Performances, a definitive set that collects all four public shows from December 9–10, 1973, and the December 8th film shoot and soundcheck, each presented in their entirety without overdubs, along with bonus content featuring rarities from a rehearsal, unreleased tracks and highlights from the recording session at Bolic Sound.

Film
There was a 3-minute trailer released in the new millennium advertising a Roxy DVD, which could potentially contain the footage from all three nights. The trailer was later included on the Baby Snakes DVD as a bonus feature.

Joe Travers has stated that "It's sitting in the vault. Waiting for a budget to do it properly. Basically the film footage, the negatives were transferred by Frank in the '80s using '80s technology. What we want to do is go back to the original negatives and do it in High Definition and then create a 5.1 mix from the original masters so that we have surround sound as well as Frank's 2 channel stereo mix. Once we get all that together, then we need to cut the program. Edit the program together, camera angles, what shows, what we are going to include from what shows or include all the shows. I have no idea what Dweezil and Gail want to do. It's great stuff, but the process of just getting to that point is going to cost a lot of money and take a lot of time."  Two songs from the unreleased film ("Montana" and "Dupree's Paradise") were used as opener for the Zappa Plays Zappa concerts in 2006.

On April 1, 2007, Zappa.com unveiled a redesigned website, which included the 30-minute segment from the Roxy performances, which had been used at the Zappa Plays Zappa concerts, on its new videos page.

The clip for "Montana" was included as a bonus feature of the Classic Albums: Apostrophe(')/Over-Nite Sensation DVD, which was released on May 1, 2007.

The Blu-ray Roxy: The Movie was released in October 2015. It includes some of the takes released on Roxy & Elsewhere and others from Roxy by Proxy, revealing some editing that went into those releases. (For instance, the second half of Zappa's "Be-Bop Tango" intro mostly matches Roxy & Elsewhere while the first half is different.)

Track listing
All selections composed by Frank Zappa and performed by Frank Zappa & the Mothers, except where noted. Original LP editions separated Zappa's vocal introductions at the start of each side; these were each listed as "Preamble". When the album was reissued on CD, these were combined as the first tracks on each side, as displayed below.

Personnel

Musicians
 Frank Zappa – lead guitar, vocals, producer
 Jeff Simmons – rhythm guitar, vocals
 Napoleon Murphy Brock – flute, tenor saxophone, vocals
 George Duke – keyboards, synthesizer, vocals
 Don Preston – synthesizer
 Bruce Fowler – trombone, dancer
 Walt Fowler – trumpet, bass trumpet
 Tom Fowler – bass guitar
 Ralph Humphrey – drums
 Chester Thompson – drums
 Ruth Underwood – percussion
 Robert "Frog" Camarena – backing vocals on "Cheepnis"
 Debbie Wilson – backing vocals on "Cheepnis"
 Linda "Lynn" Sims – backing vocals on "Cheepnis"
 Ruben Ladron de Guevara – backing vocals on "Cheepnis"

Production
 Stephen Marcussen – digital remastering
 Kerry McNabb – engineer, remixing
 Wally Heider – engineer
 Coy Featherston, Steve Magedoff – photography
 Cal Schenkel – graphic design, design

Charts
Album - Billboard (United States)

References

External links
Lyrics and information
Release details

1974 live albums
DiscReet Records albums
Frank Zappa live albums
Albums recorded at the Roxy Theatre
Albums recorded at Bolic Sound